The Opposite Side of the Sea is the debut studio album from Israeli singer Oren Lavie. It was released in January/February 2007 in Europe without major success, and later released on March 10, 2009 in the United States via Lavie's own label Quarter Past Wonderful, named under the song of the same name. The label signed a distribution deal with Adrenaline/Rocket science in order to promote the album.

Before its physical release, the album was available for digital download on January 29 at the iTunes Store.

Track listing

Release history

References
https://web.archive.org/web/20090218141427/http://orenlavie.com/book.html

2007 debut albums